P75 may refer to:

 Boulton Paul P.75 Overstrand, a British bomber aircraft
 BRM P75, a Formula One engine
 FB P-75, a pistol
 Fisher P-75 Eagle, an American fighter aircraft design
 IBM PS/2 P75, a portable computer
 , a corvette of the Indian Navy
 p75 neurotrophin receptor
 Papyrus 75, an early Greek New Testament manuscript
 P75, a state regional road in Latvia